The Evangelical Church of the River Plate ( or IERP) is a United, Protestant denomination with congregations in Argentina, Paraguay, and Uruguay. It is named after the Río de la Plata Basin, where the majority of its congregations are located. The IERP was affiliated with the Evangelical Church in Germany from 1934–1965, when it became independent. The church ordains women as ministers and supported civil unions and same-sex marriage. It has approximately 27,500 members.

The denomination is a member of the World Council of Churches and the Lutheran World Federation.

History
The Evangelical Church of the River Plate was known as the German Evangelical La Plata Synod (Deutsche Evangelische La Plata Synode) since 1899, with the most of its membership coming from German-speaking countries. Its origins go back to the union of reformed and Lutheran Christians in Germany, occurred in Germany during the 19th century.
Today has a number of 45 congregations and more than 240 points of predication, counting around 25,000 people in its membership. In 1995 the Swiss Evangelical Church in Argentina - with 600 members, 1 congregation and several house fellowships - become affiliated with the denomination. In 2010 the denomination united with the Reformed Churches in Argentina.

Beliefs
It is a Protestant church, and the basis of its faith are the Holy Scriptures, with the message of God and its live in Earth in the person of Jesus Christ.
As confessional ground it includes the Apostles' Creed, the Nicene Creed, the Athanasian Creed  the Reformed Heidelberg Catechism, Luther's Small Catechism, and the Augsburg Confession. It also accepts the Barmen Declaration and the Leuenberg Agreement.

Ecumenism
The IERP is involved in several ecumenical bodies such as the Ecumenical Human Rights Movement, Uprooted People and Refugee Ecumenical Service and ISEDET (Ecumenical Theological University) in Argentina, emergency aid in Paraguay, human rights in Uruguay.

The signing of the Leuenberg Agreement has helped the IERP to improve its relations with other churches, e.g. the United Evangelical Lutheran Church (IELU), the Waldensian Evangelical Church of the River Plate and the Reformed Churches in Argentina. The IERP has mutual recognition of ministries with the Methodist Church, the Disciples of Christ and the Presbyterian Church and the Federation of Swiss Protestant Churches. The church is a member of the World Communion of Reformed Churches.

References

External links

Official website Iglesia Evangélica del Río de la Plata.

Members of the World Communion of Reformed Churches
Reformed denominations in South America
Christianity in Argentina
Christianity in Paraguay
Christianity in Uruguay